Hienghène Sport, known in Fwâi language as Hyehen Sport is a New Caledonian football team from Hienghène playing in the New Caledonia Super Ligue, New Caledonia.

History 
The club was founded in Hienghène, North Province in 1997 and made its first participation in the New Caledonia Super Ligue in 1999 on the territory of France. Hienghène has won the national league two times, being the first in 2017, after the deduction of two points due to failing to provide referees, qualified trainers or youth teams.

The club has two appearances in the 7th round of the Coupe de France, following its success in the New Caledonia Cup. During the 2014 edition, Hienghène lost 2–1 to the AS Poissy, a Championnat National 3 club. Later in 2016, they lost 3–2 against RC Épernay Champagne, also a Championnat National 3 club. In 2019, the club competed again in the Coupe de France, but lost 3–1 in the 7th round against ASPV Strasbourg.

They won the 2019 OFC Champions League, becoming the first New Caledonian team to do so. Along the way, they conceded only one goal. In the final they defeated fellow New Caledonian club AS Magenta by a score of 1–0, with Antoine Roine scoring the only goal.

In 2019, they became the second Oceanian club not from Australia or New Zealand to compete in the FIFA Club World Cup (after Hekari United from Papua New Guinea, in 2010). In the 2019 FIFA Club World Cup, they faced the hosts, Qatari side Al Sadd in the playoff round on 11 December. Hienghène managed to take them to extra time, with Roine scoring their only goal, but Al Sadd scored twice in extra time and Hienghène were eliminated 3–1.

Honours

Domestic
New Caledonia Super Ligue
Champions (3): 2017, 2019, 2021.

New Caledonia Cup
Winners (5): 2013, 2015, 2019, 2020, 2022.

International
OFC Champions League
 Winners: 2019

Players

Current squad
Squad for 2022 OFC Champions League

Staff

Current technical staff

References

External links
Hienghène Sport profile at FIFA

 
Football clubs in New Caledonia
Association football clubs established in 1997
OFC Champions League winning clubs